Amata mjobergi is a species of moth in the family Erebidae first described by George Talbot in 1926. It is found on Borneo.

References 

mjobergi
Moths described in 1926
Moths of Borneo